Cantamath is a mathematics competition competed in Christchurch, Canterbury, New Zealand by years 6 to 10 students. 

There are two sections, the Competition section and the Project section. 

The sponsors of Cantamath are Casio, Trimble Navigation, Every Educaid, Mathletics and University of Canterbury.

Team Competition section

In the Team Competition section, each participating school sends in four selected student mathematicians per year level. The participants compete against other schools in the Christchurch Arena. It's a speed competition and takes 30 minutes. There are 20 questions for each team to complete, the aim being for each team to answer all questions the fastest. One of the four team members is a runner who runs to a judge to check if the answer to their current question is right. Each question is worth 5 points, allowing a maximum score of 100. A team can only attempt one question at a time and have to keep working on it until they get it right. Passing is allowed, but no points will be received for that question, as well as preventing the team from returning to that question. 

The winning team gets a badge and a prize from Casio.

Project section
In the Project section, the student submits a project on a certain topic. Projects can be awarded with an Excellence or Highly Commended award, depending on their quality.  There is also an Outstanding award for the best few projects in the display section. 

The categories include:
Computer Generated Design (CGD): This consists of a picture made in programs. CGDs might include polygons, curves, and circles.
Publicity Motif: This is a design for the following year's poster. One poster will be chosen and will be the poster for that year.
Mathematical Poster: A poster which is based on the current year's theme.
Geometrical Design: This is a hand-done A4 paper project which should include geometric shapes and curves.
Mathematical Models: A 3D model. The design may be static or mobile.
Varies other exist, and may be found at the Cantamath site.

References

External links
Cantamath

Education in Canterbury, New Zealand
Mathematics competitions